The Joaquin Miller House, also known as The Abbey, is a historic house in Joaquin Miller Park, a public park in the Oakland Hills area of Oakland, California, United States.  A crude, vaguely Gothic structure, it was the home of poet Joaquin Miller from 1886 until his death in 1913.  Miller was one of the nation's first poets to write about the far western United States.  The property, which includes several idiosyncratic monuments created by Miller, was designated a National Historic Landmark in 1962.

Description
The Joaquin Miller House stands on the southern edge of Joaquin Miller Park, at the northwest corner of the western junction of Joaquin Miller Road with Sanborn Drive, the park's main circulating road.  The house is a modest single-story structure, essentially little more than three separate rooms that have been joined.  Two of them are covered by gabled roofs, and have only vague vernacular references to Gothic Revival architecture.  The third section is covered by a flat roof which has broad overhanging eaves.  To this section is attached a wooden leanto of unknown function.

Joaquin Miller

Joaquin Miller, born in 1837 in Indiana, grew up in the Oregon Territory, and spent years as a young man in California during the Gold Rush years.  Poorly educated, he had a gift for verse and showmanship, and he used his experiences in the far west as material for both his poetry and touring presentations.  He was particularly popular in England, and is best known for his 1871 book Songs of the Sierras.

Miller had relocated to Washington, D. C., in 1883 and built a log cabin there while he unsuccessfully attempted a political career. He instead made his way to California and sold the cabin for $5,100 in 1887. In 1886 Miller purchased  of land in Oakland he named "The Hights". He lived there until his death in 1913. He first built a rustic one-room cabin out of redwood logs for himself and his mother, who joined him from Oregon. He then built a more elaborate home he called "The Abbey", likely named both after his third wife Abigail and as a reference to Lord Byron's home Newstead Abbey, and hosted literary figures including the young Jack London and Frank Norris.

He planted the surrounding trees and he personally built, on the eminence to the north, his own funeral pyre (eventually used to scatter his previously cremated ashes), and monuments dedicated to Moses, explorer General John C. Frémont, and the poets Robert and Elizabeth Barrett Browning.

Beginning in 1894, the Japanese poet Yone Noguchi worked as a laborer in exchange for room and board while living in the cabin adjoining Miller's. He published his first book, Seen or Unseen; or, Monologues of a Homeless Snail during this time. Though he referred to Miller as "the most natural man", Noguchi found his years living there difficult and later fictionalized his experience in his book The American Diary of a Japanese Girl. He referred to The Abbey as "Miller's sanctum or Holy Grotto".

Miller died at The Abbey on February 17, 1913, after saying his last words, "Take me away; take me away!" He had built his own funeral pyre at The Hights and asked to be cremated there with no religious ceremony and without being embalmed. His wishes were not followed and his funeral on February 19 drew thousands. He had left no will and his estate — estimated at $100,000 — was divided between his wife, Abigail, and daughter, Juanita.

Landmark
The Hights was purchased by the city of Oakland in 1919. It was declared a National Historic Landmark in 1962. The simple Victorian style house is also listed on the National Register of Historic Places on October 15, 1966.

See also
Joaquin Miller Cabin - Washington, DC
List of National Historic Landmarks in California
National Register of Historic Places listings in Alameda County, California

References

Houses completed in 1886
History of Oakland, California
Houses on the National Register of Historic Places in California
National Historic Landmarks in the San Francisco Bay Area
National Register of Historic Places in Oakland, California
Houses in Oakland, California
Victorian architecture in California
1886 establishments in California